Les Hatton (born 5 February 1948) is a British-born computer scientist and mathematician most notable for his work on failures and vulnerabilities in software controlled systems.

He was educated at King's College, Cambridge 1967–1970 and the University of Manchester where he received a Master of Science degree in electrostatic waves in relativistic plasma and a Doctor of Philosophy in 1973 for his work on computational fluid dynamics in tornadoes.

Although originally a geophysicist, a career for which he was awarded the 1987 Conrad Schlumberger Award for his work in computational geophysics, he switched careers in the early 1990s to study software and systems failure.  He has published 4 books and over 100 refereed journal publications and his theoretical and experimental work on software systems failure can be found in IEEE Transactions on Software Engineering, IEEE Computer, IEEE Software, Nature, and IEEE Computational Science and Engineering. His book Safer C pioneered the use of safer language subsets in commercial embedded control systems.  He was also cited amongst the leading scholars of systems and software engineering by the Journal of Systems and Software for the period 1997–2001.

Primarily a computer scientist nowadays, he retains wide interests and has published recently on artificial complexity in mobile phone charging, the aerodynamics of javelins and novel bibliographic search algorithms for unstructured text to extract patterns from defect databases.

After spending most of his career in industry working for Oakwood Computing Associates, he is currently a professor of Forensic Software Engineering at Kingston University, London.

References 

1948 births
Living people
Alumni of King's College, Cambridge
Alumni of the University of Manchester
Academics of Kingston University
British computer scientists
20th-century British mathematicians
21st-century British mathematicians
Place of birth missing (living people)